Jastarnia Lighthouse (Polish: Latarnia Morska Jastarnia) is a lighthouse in Jastarnia on the Polish coast of the Baltic Sea. The lighthouse is located in Jastarnia, Pomeranian Voivodeship on the Hel Peninsula.

The lighthouse in Jastarnia is located between the lighthouse in Rozewie and the lighthouse in Hel.

Technical data 
 Light characteristic
 Light: 2 s.
 Darkness: 2 s.
 Light: 7 s.
 Darkness: 9 s.
 Period: 20 s.

See also 

 List of lighthouses in Poland

References

External links 

 Urząd Morski w Słupsku  

Lighthouses completed in 1950
Resort architecture in Pomerania
Lighthouses in Poland
Tourist attractions in Pomeranian Voivodeship